Chayanta may refer to:
Chayanta Province, a province in the Potosí Department in Bolivia
Chayanta Municipality, a municipio in the Rafael Bustillo Province in Bolivia
Chayanta, Bolivia, a small town in the Chayanta Municipality in Bolivia
 Chayanta River, in the Potosí Department of Bolivia.